Kenneth Lavon "Chucky" Atkins (born August 14, 1974) is an American former professional basketball player who played for nine different NBA teams throughout his career.

Basketball career
Atkins played college basketball at the University of South Florida from 1992 to 1996. As of November 2020 he still owns three team records. He is a member of the USF Athletic Hall of Fame.

Atkins was undrafted in the 1996 NBA draft. In 1996–97, he played with the LaCrosse Bobcats in the now-defunct CBA before going overseas to play for the Cibona Zagreb club in Croatia from 1997 to 1999.

Atkins started his NBA career in 1999 with the Orlando Magic, with immediate impact, playing in all 82 games and averaging nine points and four assists per game. He then played for the Detroit Pistons (being included in a July 2000 deal which brought Grant Hill to Orlando) and Boston Celtics (being traded midway through 2003–04 for Mike James, thus not appearing in the 2004 NBA Finals).

In 2004, Atkins was traded in a multi-player deal which sent Gary Payton to Boston and Atkins to the Los Angeles Lakers. During 2004–05, he registered career-highs in points (14 ppg) and minutes (35), playing and starting in all 82 regular season contests.

Atkins was traded along with Caron Butler to the Washington Wizards in exchange for Kwame Brown and Laron Profit in the 2005 offseason. As Atkins appeared sparingly throughout the season, the Wizards bought out the remainder of his contract on January 18, 2006. Atkins had voiced displeasure with the amount of playing time he was receiving, and he and the team both felt a change of scenery was needed.

On January 23, 2006, Atkins signed as a free agent with the Memphis Grizzlies, replacing the injured Damon Stoudamire. Atkins averaged in double figures in his half-season stint in Memphis.

Atkins signed as a free agent in July 2007 with the Denver Nuggets. A hernia injury plagued him throughout most of the year, and he failed to have a significant impact in 2007–08.

On January 7, 2009, the Nuggets traded Atkins, along with a 2009 first round draft pick and cash considerations, to the Oklahoma City Thunder for Johan Petro and a 2009 second round draft pick.

On July 27, 2009, he was traded to the Minnesota Timberwolves along with Damien Wilkins for center Etan Thomas and two future second-round draft picks.

On September 22, 2009, Chucky Atkins was waived by the Minnesota Timberwolves. He signed a non guaranteed contract with the Detroit Pistons on September 28, 2009. Atkins played 40 games for the Pistons in his second stint with them during the 2009–2010 season .

On September 27, 2010, Atkins signed with the Phoenix Suns. He was waived on October 11, 2010.

After retiring from the game in 2011, Atkins went on to coach his alum high school in 2012–13 and 2013–14 before quitting the job on the eve of the 2014–15 season after he was arrested on charges of driving under the influence twice within three months.

NBA career statistics

Regular season

|-
| align="left" | 
| align="left" | Orlando
| 82 || 0 || 19.8 || .424 || .350 || .729 || 1.5 || 3.7 || .6 || .0 || 9.5
|-
| align="left" | 
| align="left" | Detroit
| 81 || 75 || 29.2 || .399 || .357 || .692 || 2.1 || 4.1 || .8 || .1 || 12.0
|-
| align="left" | 
| align="left" | Detroit
| 79 || 62 || 28.9 || .466 || .411 || .692 || 2.0 || 3.3 || .9 || .1 || 12.1
|-
| align="left" | 
| align="left" | Detroit
| 65 || 7 || 21.5 || .361 || .355 || .816 || 1.5 || 2.7 || .4 || .1 || 7.1
|-
| align="left" | 
| align="left" | Detroit
| 40 || 0 || 18.8 || .374 || .323 || .721 || 1.2 || 2.4 || .5 || .0 || 6.2
|-
| align="left" | 
| align="left" | Boston
| 24 || 24 || 33.0 || .418 || .351 || .778 || 1.9 || 5.3 || 1.1 || .0 || 12.0
|-
| align="left" | 
| align="left" | L.A. Lakers
| 82 || 82 || 35.4 || .426 || .387 || .803 || 2.4 || 4.4 || .9 || .0 || 13.6
|-
| align="left" | 
| align="left" | Washington
| 28 || 2 || 19.7 || .379 || .359 || .710 || 1.6 || 2.5 || .5 || .0 || 6.7
|-
| align="left" | 
| align="left" | Memphis
| 43 || 39 || 27.0 || .401 || .352 || .811 || 1.7 || 3.0 || .7 || .1 || 11.4
|-
| align="left" | 
| align="left" | Memphis
| 75 || 23 || 27.5 || .434 || .379 || .810 || 1.9 || 4.6 || .7 || .1 || 13.2
|-
| align="left" | 
| align="left" | Denver
| 24 || 0 || 14.7 || .344 || .316 || .444 || 1.3 || 2.0 || .4 || .0 || 4.7
|-
| align="left" | 
| align="left" | Denver
| 14 || 0 || 8.2 || .333 || .294 || 1.000 || .4 || 2.0 || .1 || .1 || 1.9
|-
| align="left" | 
| align="left" | Oklahoma City
| 18 || 0 || 16.6 || .291 || .250 || .917 || 1.0 || 1.7 || .4 || .1 || 3.9
|-
| align="left" | 
| align="left" | Detroit
| 40 || 11 || 16.1 || .363 || .301 || .926 || .7 || 2.3 || .4 || .0 || 4.0
|- class="sortbottom"
| style="text-align:center;" colspan="2"| Career
| 696 || 325 || 24.9 || .412 || .364 || .772 || 1.7 || 3.4 || .7 || .0 || 9.9

Playoffs

|-
| align="left" | 2002
| align="left" | Detroit
| 10 || 10 || 29.4 || .364 || .359 || .765 || 2.4 || 3.4 || .6 || .1 || 11.3
|-
| align="left" | 2003
| align="left" | Detroit
| 17 || 3 || 18.4 || .352 || .367 || .808 || 1.2 || 1.5 || 1.0 || .0 || 6.1
|-
| align="left" | 2004
| align="left" | Boston
| 4 || 4 || 33.3 || .436 || .300 || .895 || 3.5 || 3.8 || .8 || .0 || 13.5
|-
| align="left" | 2006
| align="left" | Memphis
| 4 || 4 || 25.8 || .405 || .364 || .625 || .8 || 3.0 || .5 || .0 || 9.8
|-
| align="left" | 2008
| align="left" | Denver
| 1 || 0 || 3.0 || .000 || .000 || .000 || 1.0 || .0 || .0 || .0 || .0
|- class="sortbottom"
| style="text-align:center;" colspan="2"| Career
| 36 || 21 || 23.5 || .374 || .355 || .800 || 1.7 || 2.4 || .8 || .0 || 8.6

References

External links

Chucky Atkins playerfile at NBA.com
NBA biography of Chucky Atkins
Stats at DatabaseBasketball

1974 births
Living people
American expatriate basketball people in Croatia
American men's basketball players
Basketball players from Orlando, Florida
Boston Celtics players
Denver Nuggets players
Detroit Pistons players
KK Cibona players
La Crosse Bobcats players
Los Angeles Lakers players
Memphis Grizzlies players
Oklahoma City Thunder players
Orlando Magic players
Phoenix Suns players
Point guards
South Florida Bulls men's basketball players
Undrafted National Basketball Association players
Universiade gold medalists for the United States
Universiade medalists in basketball
Washington Wizards players
Medalists at the 1995 Summer Universiade